Guðmundur Guðmundsson (1 May 1920 – 9 January 2007) was an Icelandic alpine skier. He competed in three events at the 1948 Winter Olympics.

References

1920 births
2007 deaths
Icelandic male alpine skiers
Olympic alpine skiers of Iceland
Alpine skiers at the 1948 Winter Olympics
People from Akureyri